Harvey Axford Schofield (March 28, 1877 – August 3, 1941) served as was an American football and basketball player and coach and college administrator.  He served head football coach at Stevens Point Normal School—now known as the University of Wisconsin–Stevens Point—in 1900 and 1903, compiling a record of 2–3–1. Schofield was as the president of the University of Wisconsin–Eau Claire from 1916 to 1940. Schofield Hall is named in his honor.

Head coaching record

References

External links
 

1877 births
1941 deaths
19th-century players of American football
American men's basketball players
Presidents of the University of Wisconsin System
Wisconsin Badgers football players
Wisconsin Badgers men's basketball players
Wisconsin–Stevens Point Pointers men's basketball players
Wisconsin–Stevens Point Pointers football coaches
Wisconsin–Stout Blue Devils football players
People from Augusta, Wisconsin
Players of American football from Wisconsin
Basketball players from Wisconsin